Stargazer is a 2008 children's fantasy novel, the fifth book in the Land of Elyon series by Patrick Carman. It takes place shortly after Into the Mist, in which Roland tells his story while they are sailing.

Plot
Alexa Daley, the protagonist, had only recently defeated the Abaddon (the main antagonist throughout the series)...or so she thought.

Abaddon was last seen falling back into the black pit in which he was contained, defeated along with Victor Grindall, one of Abaddon's underlings. Abaddon had taken on a new form, a metal serpent of the sea, harnessing the deadly power of electricity.

Books in this series 
 The Dark Hills Divide (Book 1)
 Beyond the Valley of Thorns (Book 2)
 The Tenth City (Book 3)
 Into the Mist (Prequel)
 Stargazer (Patrick Carman) (Book 4)

Characters
The main character is Alexa Daley. Her father is Warvold, and her uncle is Roland.

References

2008 American novels
2008 children's books
2008 fantasy novels
Children's fantasy novels
American children's novels
The Land of Elyon